Guyana competed at the 2020 Summer Paralympics in Tokyo, Japan, from 24 August to 5 September 2021. This was the country's debut appearance in the Paralympic Games.

Cycling 

Guyana sent one male cyclist after successfully getting a slot in the 2018 UCI Nations Ranking Allocation quota for the Americas.

See also 
Guyana at the Paralympics
Guyana at the 2020 Summer Olympics

References 

Nations at the 2020 Summer Paralympics
2020